The Bolshoy Uzen or Ulken Uzen ( Úlken Ózen or ) is a river in Saratov Oblast of Russia and West Kazakhstan Province of Kazakhstan.

The town of Novouzensk is situated at the Bolshoy Uzen. The river is used for water supply and irrigation.

Course
The Bolshoy Uzen has its sources on the western edge of the Obshchy Syrt highlands of Russia, and flows in a generally southerly direction over the steppes of the Caspian Depression. The Bolshoy Uzen runs parallel to the Maly Uzen, some  further west. Lake Balykty Sarkyl lies between both rivers. The river ends close to Sarykol village in one of the Kamys-Samar Lakes, a group of small lakes and swamps in Western Kazakhstan.

The river's flow peaks in April, since most of the its waters come from snowmelt. In the summer some stretches of the Bolshoy Uzen may dry up completely. The river freezes over in December and stays icebound until the end of March or the beginning of April.

References

External links

Rivers of Saratov Oblast
Rivers of Kazakhstan